Anna-Lena Friedsam (born 1 February 1994) is a German tennis player.

In August 2016, Friedsam reached her best singles ranking of world No. 45. In doubles, she peaked at world No. 34 in September 2020.

In her career, she has won three doubles titles on the WTA Tour, one WTA 125 singles title as well as 13 singles and three doubles titles on the ITF Circuit. She played also in the fourth round of one Grand Slam championship, at the 2016 Australian Open.

Career overview

2012
Friedsam won her first $25k tournament in 2012, at the Infond Open.

2015: First WTA final 
In Linz, Friedsam reached her first WTA singles final, losing to Anastasia Pavlyuchenkova in straight sets.

2016-2018: Grand Slam fourth round, top 50 debut, extended hiatus due to surgery 
At the 2016 Australian Open, she reached her first and so far only Grand Slam round of 16. There, she lost to Agnieszka Radwańska after a big battle and struggling with injury during the match. In the previous round, she defeated US Open finalist and top 20 player Roberta Vinci. 

Shoulder pain and two surgeries in 2016 and 2017 kept Friedsam out of the game for more than two years. She came back to the WTA tour with a protected ranking at the Miami Open 2019.

2020: Second WTA final
At the 2020 Lyon Open, she reached the final but lost to Sofia Kenin. On her way to the final she defeated two former top-10 players, Kristina Mladenovic and Daria Kasatkina, respectively.

2022: Two 125k finals

After slipping down the rankings following the Covid break in 2020, Friedsam bounced back in the second half of 2022, reaching the semifinal at Portoroz, beating 2020 US Open champion Emma Raducanu alongside. She finished the year with two WTA 125k finals at Midland and Angers, losing to Catherine McNally and Alycia Parks respectively.

2023: Two WTA quarterfinals
At the 2023 Upper Austria Ladies Linz she reached the quarterfinals as a qualifier defeating fellow qualifier and former top-10 player Sara Errani and fourth seed Anhelina Kalinina. At the same tournament in doubles, she reached her seventh final  with Nadiia Kichenok.

At the inaugural edition of the 2023 ATX Open in Austin, Texas, she reached her second consecutive quarterfinal defeating lucky loser Erika Andreeva in an over 3 hours match with a third set longest tiebreak 
for the season. This win marked Friedsam's return to the world top 100 for the first time since her shoulder surgery in January 2017. At the same tournament she reached the doubles semifinals with Nadiia Kichenok.

Performance timelines

Only WTA Tour and Grand Slam main-draw and Billie Jean King Cup results are considered in the career statistics.

Singles
Current through the 2023 Indian Wells Open qualifying.

Doubles
Current through the 2023 ATX Open.

Significant finals

WTA 1000

Doubles: 1 (1 runner-up)

WTA career finals

Singles: 2 (2 runner-ups)

Doubles: 7 (3 titles, 4 runner-ups)

WTA 125 tournament finals

Singles: 4 (1 title, 3 runner-ups)

Doubles: 2 (runner-ups)

ITF Circuit finals

Singles: 19 (13 titles, 6 runner-ups)

Doubles: 5 (3 titles, 2 runner-ups)

Record against top 10 players

Friedsam's match record against players who have been ranked in the top 10.

  Anett Kontaveit 2–0
  Emma Raducanu 2–0
  Kristina Mladenovic 2–1
  Dominika Cibulková 1–0
  Sara Errani 1–0
  Johanna Konta 1–0
  Lucie Šafářová 1–0
  Belinda Bencic 1–1
  Eugenie Bouchard 1–1
  Roberta Vinci 1–1
  Daria Kasatkina 1–2
  Andrea Petkovic 1–2
  Ons Jabeur 0–1
  Sofia Kenin 0–1
  Elena Rybakina 0–1
  Aryna Sabalenka 0–1
  Francesca Schiavone 0–1
  Carla Suárez Navarro 0–1
  Caroline Garcia 0–2
  Jessica Pegula 0–2
  Karolína Plíšková 0–2
  Agnieszka Radwańska 0–2
  Serena Williams 0–2
  Kiki Bertens 0–3
  Angelique Kerber 0–3

*

Top 10 wins

Notes

References

External links

 
 
 

1994 births
Living people
People from Neuwied
German female tennis players
Tennis players at the 2010 Summer Youth Olympics
Olympic tennis players of Germany
Tennis players at the 2020 Summer Olympics